The 2014–15 Macedonian Handball Super League (known as the VIP Super Liga for sponsorship reasons) is the 23rd season of the Super League, Macedonia's premier Handball league.

Team information 

The following 12 clubs compete in the Super League during the 2014–15 season:

Regular season

Standings

Pld - Played; W - Won; D - Drawn; L - Lost; GF - Goals for; GA - Goals against; Diff - Difference; Pts - Points.

Championship round

Standings

Pld - Played; W - Won; D - Drawn; L - Lost; GF - Goals for; GA - Goals against; Diff - Difference; Pts - Points.

Schedule and results
In the table below the home teams are listed on the left and the away teams along the top.

References

External links
 Macedonian Handball Federaration 

2014–15 domestic handball leagues